RentPath Inc. is a media company that owns Rent.com, ApartmentGuide.com, Lovely, and Rentals.com, which combined see 16 million visitors each month. It was previously called K-III and PriMedia. The company was acquired by Redfin in April 2021.

History
The company was founded in 1989 as K-III Communications Corporation by  Kohlberg Kravis Roberts.

In 1989, it acquired Macmillan Book Clubs and Gryphon Editions (renamed Newbridge Communications) and Intertec Publishing from Macmillan Inc. and Webb Publishing from Maxwell Communications Corporation.

In 1990, it acquired Ward's from Thomson Corporation It also acquired the business publications of Andrews Communications,  Readers Garden, operator of special interest book clubs, and Weekly Reader and Funk & Wagnalls from Marshall Field 5th.

In 1991, it acquired 9 magazines from News Corporation for $600 million: Daily Racing Form, Soap Opera Digest, Soap Opera Weekly, New York, Seventeen, Premiere, European Travel & Life, Automobile, and New Woman.

In 1992, it acquired medical publisher Krames from Grolier. It also acquired Films for the Humanities & Sciences.

In 1993, it acquired three magazines from Wiesner. It also acquired World Almanac from E. W. Scripps Company.

In 1994, it acquired Stagebill, Gibbs College, Haas Publishing, now Consumer Source Inc., publisher of Apartment Guide, and PJS Publications.

In 1995, the company became a public company via an initial public offering, selling 15 million shares at $12 per share in a deal that left Kohlberg Kravis Roberts with control of 82.2% of the company's shares. It also acquired the US trade magazine operations of Maclean-Hunter, Chicago from Landmark Media Enterprises, and McMullen & Yee Publishing, a publisher of automotive magazine.

In 1996, the company acquired 14 publications from Cahners Consumer Magazines, Pro Football Weekly, and Westcott Communications, later renamed Primedia Workplace Learning.

In 1997, the company acquired Farm Press, Park Avenue Publishing, publisher of Lowrider, and Intellichoice. It also sold Krames to Times Mirror, sold New Woman to Rodale, Inc., and sold Katharine Gibbs to Career Education Corporation.

As of November 18, 1997, the company changed its name to Primedia to more clearly focus on its core business.

In 1998, the company acquired Cowles Enthusiast Media and Cowles Business Media divisions of Cowles Media Company from McClatchy Newspapers. It sold Daily Racing Form to private investors, sold Stagebill to Fred B. Tarter, sold Newbridge Communications to Doubleday Direct, and acquired Sterling/MacFadden's teen magazines and teen publisher Laufer Publishing.

In 1999, the company sold its education unit (Weekly Reader, World Almanac) to Ripplewood Holdings, acquired Multimedia Publishing, and sold Better Nutrition, Southwest Art, and Vegetarian Times to Sabot Publishing.

In 2000, the company acquired About.com for $690 million.

In 2001, the company acquired EMAP's US magazines and closed Country Journal.

In 2002, the company sold  Modern Bride to Condé Nast Publications, sold Pro Football Weekly to Arkush family, sold Chicago  to Tribune Company, and sold American Baby to Meredith Corporation.

In 2003, the company sold Volleyball, Teddy Bear and Friends and Doll Reader to Ashton International Media, sold Seventeen to Hearst Corporation for $182.4 million, sold New York to Bruce Wasserstein for $55 million, sold Tiger Beat and Bop to Laufer Media, sold Kitplanes to Belvoir Publications, and sold Simba Information to R.R. Bowker.

In 2004, the company sold Folio and Circulation Management to a joint venture with Red 7 Media.

In 2005, the company sold About.com to The New York Times Company for $410 million, sold Prism Business Media (ex-Intertec) to private investors Wasserstein & Co. (later merged with Penton Media), and sold Ward's to Prism Business Media.

In 2006, the company sold history magazines to Weider History Group, sold Crafts Group to Sandler Capital Management for $132 million, and sold Outdoor Group to InterMedia Partners

In 2007, the company sold a group of 17 outdoor-oriented magazines to InterMedia Outdoors for $170 million in cash, in a deal that included Guns and Ammo and Fly Fisherman. It also sold its Enthusiast Media division to Source Interlink, controlled by Ronald Burkle, in a deal that netted Primedia $1.15 billion in cash in exchange for a group of more than 70 magazines, including Motor Trend and Soap Opera Digest and 90 consumer web sites. The deal left Primedia to focus on a series of free print and online consumer guides published by its Consumer Source unit. It also sold Gems group to Interweave, sold Climbing to Skram Media, sold Films for the Humanities & Sciences to Infobase Publishing, and sold Channel One News to Alloy Media and Marketing.

In 2008, the company sold South Florida Auto Guide and Wisconsin Auto Guide to Target Media Partners and closed Atlanta Auto Guide.

In 2009, the company closed Today's Custom Home.

In 2011, TPG Capital bought Primedia for $525 million.

In 2012, the company acquired rent.com from eBay.

In 2013, the company changed its name to RentPath. In 2014 it acquired Lovely for $13 million.

In 2014, Providence Equity Partners LLC acquired 50% of the company.

In July 2015, former CEO of Autotrader.com, Chip Perry, was named president and CEO of RentPath. He succeeded Charles Stubbs who remained on the RentPath board of directors.

In November 2015, Chip Perry stepped down as president and CEO of RentPath, to take over as CEO of TrueCar.

RentPath named Marc P. Lefar as President and CEO on April 4, 2016. He was replaced by Dhiren Fonseca in December 2020.

In February 2020, RentPath filed bankruptcy in preparation for acquisition by CoStar, which reached an agreement to acquire RentPath for $588 million. On December 29, 2020, new CEO Fonseca terminated RentPath's agreement to be acquired by CoStar.

On April 5, 2021, RentPath was acquired by Redfin for $608 million. RentPath rental home listings will be integrated into Redfin.com by 2022. RentPath's headquarters remain in Atlanta and Fonseca remains in his role as CEO while the new owners seek a new permanent head.

Former notable titles

Automotive

Equestrian
Arabian Horse World
Dressage Today
EQUUS
Horse & Rider
Practical Horseman

Action Sports

References

Magazine publishing companies of the United States
Private equity portfolio companies
Kohlberg Kravis Roberts companies
Publishing companies established in 1989
Companies that filed for Chapter 11 bankruptcy in 2020
2021 mergers and acquisitions